Sālote Tupou III (born Sālote Mafile‘o Pilolevu; 13 March 1900 – 16 December 1965) was Queen of Tonga from 1918 to her death in 1965. She reigned for nearly 48 years, longer than any other Tongan monarch. She was well known for her height, standing 6 ft 3 in (1.91 metres) tall in her prime.

Early life 

Sālote (Charlotte) was born on 13 March 1900 in Tonga as the eldest daughter and heir of King George Tupou II of Tonga and his first wife, Queen Lavinia Veiongo. She was baptized and named after her great-grandmother Sālote Mafile‘o Pilolevu (daughter of George Tupou I). She was not popular, as she was perceived as being born from the 'wrong mother' because of her mother's lower rank and was disliked so much that it was not safe for her to go outside the palace.

Her mother, Queen Lavinia, died from tuberculosis on 25 April 1902. After her death, the Chiefs in Tonga urged King George Tupou II for many years to remarry to produce a male heir. On 11 November 1909, when the King finally married the 16-year-old ʻAnaseini Takipō, (half-sister of the rejected candidate 'Ofakivava'u', from the first search of a wife for the King), the chiefs were jubilant. Queen Anaseni gave birth twice, both girls: Princess ʻOnelua (born 20 March 1911; died of convulsions aged six months, on 19 August 1911) and Princess ʻElisiva Fusipala Taukiʻonetuku (born 26 July 1912; died from tubercular peritonitis on 21 April 1933 aged 20).

Education 
In December 1909 Sālote was sent to Auckland, New Zealand, to start five years of education. She returned to Tonga every Christmas holiday. After December 1914 the King ordered her to stay home in Tonga as hopes for Queen Anaseni giving birth to a male heir were low. She later began a course of instruction in Tongan history and customs.

Personal history 
In 1917, Sālote married Viliami Tungī Mailefihi, an adult noble then 30 years old, 13 years her senior. At the age of 18, she became a mother for the first time. Her children were:

 Prince Siaosi Tāufaʻāhau Tupoulahi (4 July 1918 – 10 September 2006), later known as King Tāufa‘āhau Tupou IV, 
 Prince Uiliami Tuku‘aho (5 November 1919 – 28 April 1936), who died young, 
 Prince Sione Ngū Manumataongo (7 January 1922 – 10 April 1999), later known as 5th Tu'ipelehake (Fatafehi),
Three pregnancies ended in miscarriages.

Queen Sālote died on 16 December 1965 at Auckland City Hospital, after a long illness. Her body was flown back to Tonga.

Achievements 

Her marriage to Tungī Mailefihi had been a political masterstroke by her father, as Tungī was a direct descendant of the Tu‘i Ha‘atakalaua, which at that time was seen as belonging to the Tu‘i Tonga's kauhala‘uta. Their children, therefore, combined the blood of the three grand royal dynasties in Tonga.

In 1920–1921, she assisted the Bernice P. Bishop Museum's Bayard Dominick Expedition with their mapping of Tongan archaeological sites by providing access to localities and information. The expedition's reports on the Tongan past—including a large volume of material which still remains unpublished even today—were primarily compiled by Edward Winslow Gifford and provided the groundwork for comprehensive studies of the pre-contact history of the Tongans (Burley 1998). She was also a keen writer and author of dance songs and love poems, published in 2004, edited by her biographer, Elizabeth Wood-Ellem.

Salote led Tonga through World War II, with the islands declaring war on Germany in 1940 and on Japan in 1941 following the attack on Pearl Harbor. She put Tonga's resources at the disposal of Britain and supported the Allied cause throughout the war. Tongan troops saw battle against the Japanese in the Solomon Islands campaign, including on Guadalcanal.

She brought Tonga to international attention when, during her sole visit to Europe, she attended the 1953 coronation of Queen Elizabeth II in London. During the coronation procession, it began to rain and hoods were placed on the carriages in the procession. As Tongan custom dictates that one should not imitate the actions of persons one is honouring, she refused a hood and rode through the pouring rain in an open carriage with Sultan Ibrahim IV of Kelantan, endearing herself to spectators. She served as Chairman of the Tonga Traditions Committee 1954–1965 and patronised the Tonga Red Cross Society.

Depictions in popular culture 
Trinidadian-Venezuelan musician Edmundo Ros composed, recorded, and performed a calypso song titled "The Queen of Tonga" whose lyrics refer to Queen Salote attending the coronation of Elizabeth II.

Family tree

Honours 
 : Honorary Dame Grand Cross of the Order of St Michael and St George
 : Honorary Dame Grand Cross of the Royal Victorian Order
 : Honorary Dame Grand Cross of the Order of the British Empire
 : Honorary Dame Grand Cross of the Order of St John
 : Recipient of the King George V Silver Jubilee Medal
 : Recipient of the King George VI Coronation Medal
 : Recipient of the Queen Elizabeth II Coronation Medal

Notes

References 
, (1967), The Friendly Islanders: a story of Queen Salote and her people, London: Hodder & Stoughton.
 (1998): Tongan Archaeology and the Tongan Past, 2850-150 B.P. Journal of World Prehistory 12 (3): 337–392.  (HTML abstract)

 (2004): Songs and poems of Queen Salote. 
 (1954), Queen Salote & Her Kingdom, London: Putnam.

External links 

1900 births
1965 deaths
Tongan monarchs
Tongan women in politics
Tongan people of World War II
Queens regnant in Oceania
World War II political leaders
Honorary Dames Grand Cross of the Order of St Michael and St George
Honorary Dames Grand Cross of the Royal Victorian Order
Honorary Dames Grand Cross of the Order of the British Empire
Dames Grand Cross of the Order of St John
Tongan Methodists
People from Tongatapu
Deaths in New Zealand
Protestant monarchs
20th-century Tongan women
20th-century women rulers
20th-century monarchs in Oceania